Marcel Emile Gaston LePlat (December 2, 1913 – March 29, 2014), known professionally as Marc Platt, was an American ballet dancer, musical theatre performer, and actor. He was best known for his portrayal of Daniel Pontipee, one of the seven brothers in the film Seven Brides for Seven Brothers.

Career
Born Marcel Emile Gaston LePlat to a French immigrant father in Pasadena, California, he was one of the original members of the Ballet Russe de Monte Carlo, performing under the name Platoff. While with the company, Platt choreographed Ghost Town (1939), set to music by Richard Rodgers.

Platt danced the role of Chalmers/Dream Curly in the original 1943 Broadway production of Oklahoma! . Platt was also in the 1955 film version of Oklahoma! in a dancing/speaking role as one of Curly's cowboy friends. He is the cowboy friend who buys Curly's saddle for $10 at the auction - and who also comments that, the previous year, Ado Annie's sweet potato pie gave him a 'three day bellyache' (Platt is credited in the cast list of the film as a dancer).

Another notable role for Platt was as Bill Calhoun / Lucent (replacement) in the Cole Porter musical, KISS ME, KATE, which opened on Broadway on December 30, 1948, though Platt did not join the cast until
1949.

After he stopped dancing, Platt served as the director of the Radio City Music Hall Ballet for several years, then transitioned to full-time teaching. In 2000, Platt was presented with the Nijinsky Award at the Ballets Russes Reunion. He appeared in the 2005 documentary Ballets Russes.

Personal life
Platt was married twice and has three children. Ted Le Plat, from his first marriage, is an actor and musician living in Los Angeles. In 1951, Platt married dancer Jean Goodall who died in 1994; the couple had two children, Michael and Donna.

Platt died of pneumonia at a hospice in San Rafael, California on March 29, 2014, aged 100.

Filmography
 The Gay Parisian (1941) (short subject)
 You're in the Army Now (1941) 
 Who Calls (1942) (short subject) 
 Tonight and Every Night (1945)
 Tars and Spars (1946)
 Down to Earth (1947)
 When a Girl's Beautiful (1947) 
 The Swordsman (1948)
 Addio Mimi! (1949) 
 Seven Brides for Seven Brothers (1954)
 Oklahoma! (1955)
 These Wilder Years (1956)
 Ballets Russes (2005) (documentary)
 Broadway: Beyond the Golden Age (2018) (documentary)

Stage appearances
Jubilee (1935)
Broadway Sho-Window (1936)
Yokel Boy (1939)
The Lady Comes Across (1942)
Beat the Band (1942)
Oklahoma! (1943)
Kiss Me, Kate (1949-1952) 
Maggie (1953)

References

Sources
 Anawalt, Sasha. The Joffrey Ballet: Robert Joffrey and the Making of an American Ballet Company. Chicago: University of Chicago Press, 1996. 
 Wilk, Max. OK! The Story of Oklahoma!: A Celebration of America's Most Beloved Musical. Rev. ed. New York: Applause Books, 2002.

External links
 Marc Platt profile at arts•meme
 Interview in the Seattle Times
  
 
 Marc Platt movies at The New York Times

1913 births
2014 deaths
People from Pasadena, California
American male ballet dancers
American male musical theatre actors
American choreographers
Ballet Russe de Monte Carlo dancers
American centenarians
American male film actors
Men centenarians
20th-century American ballet dancers